Jon St. John (born December 19, 1960) is an American voice actor, former radio personality and ordained minister. He is best known for his voice roles such as Duke Nukem in the Duke Nukem video game series and Big the Cat and E-123 Omega in the Sonic the Hedgehog video game franchise.

Career
He started his career in voice work in 1975, when he was a Top 40 radio DJ in North Carolina. Because of his vocal talent and technical skills, he was hired as a production director for several US radio stations in cities including: New Orleans, Philadelphia, Phoenix, San Diego, and Los Angeles. St. John was a radio personality for many years most recently on K-EARTH 101 in Los Angeles.

He has provided the voice for numerous video game characters, such as the voice for the drill instructor Dwight T. Barnes as well as various other Marines in Half-Life: Opposing Force. He has done the voices for Big the Cat in Sonic Adventure and Sonic Heroes, Trash Man, General Warthog and other characters in Twisted Metal 4, E-102 Gamma in Sonic Battle, the announcer in Sonic Advance 3, E-123 Omega in Sonic Heroes, Bolt Logan in Chrome and Chrome: SpecForce and Agent Michael Ford in Conduit 2.

St. John is best known for being the voice of Duke Nukem in the Duke Nukem video game series from 1996 onwards, starting with Duke Nukem 3D with re-casting of Joe Siegler and Todd Replogle of Apogee Software. He stated in an interview that the voice of Duke Nukem was based upon Clint Eastwood's voice with a lower pitch.

He dubs the voice of professor Simon and Archibald in Runaway 2: The Dream of the Turtle. He provided the narrator's voice in Forsaken. He voiced "Jack Boyd" in the video games This Is The Police and its sequel. St. John voices characters for rides and attractions at the Legoland theme park in Carlsbad, CA. and at Dollywood theme park in Tennessee, he's the voice of Buzz the Buzzard, an audio animatronic character who introduces riders to the Mystery Mine ride.

He was also the crew chief in NASCAR Racing 2003 Season, NASCAR Racing 2002 Season, and NASCAR Racing 4. In 2011, he voiced for an exclusive Heroes of Newerth announcer pack and also a special sound pack for the TeamSpeak voice communication software. He is currently working on voicing for Dudebro II and Dota 2, as well as providing PvP voiceovers for Guild Wars 2.

In 2019, he took on the role of the Postal Dude for Postal 4: No Regerts, stepping in to replace Rick Hunter, the previous voice actor, due to unavailability.

In August 2019, St. John announced he was now an Ordained Minister.

Filmography

Television

Video games

References

External links
 Official website
 Jon St. John at MobyGames
 
 (Date of Recording - January 21, 2021)

1960 births
Living people
American male video game actors
American male voice actors
Male actors from Virginia
20th-century American male actors
21st-century American male actors
Year of birth missing (living people)